The Central Ontario Visitor was a weekly community newspaper in Bobcaygeon, Ontario, Canada, published in conjunction with the Bobcaygeon Independent  and the Fenelon Falls Gazette. It was established in 1985. 

The paper was geared towards tourists, and was inserted, weekly, into the Independent and Gazette during the warmer months of May through October.

Past editors
 Norm Wagenaar (199?–1999)

Past publishers
 Andrea Douglas (1995–1998)
 Charles Canning (1998–1998)
 Myra Futa (1998–2000)

References

Weekly newspapers published in Ontario
Publications established in 1985
Publications disestablished in 1999
1985 establishments in Ontario
1999 disestablishments in Ontario